John Longmire  (born 31 December 1970) is the current coach of the Sydney Swans. As a player, he represented the North Melbourne Football Club in the Australian Football League (AFL) from 1988 to 1999.

Early years
Longmire was born in Corowa, New South Wales. He took up Australian rules as a child and first came into notice when he won the 1984 Thirds goal kicking award in the Coreen & District Football League with Corowa-Rutherglen. In his first season of senior football career with Corowa-Rutherglen in New South Wales, he nearly won the Ovens & Murray Football League's leading goalkicker title in 1987 as a 16-year-old, kicking 82 goals. His ability and size quickly attracted the interest of the North Melbourne VFL club's talent scouts.

Longmire's grandfather is former Fitzroy Football Club player Keith Williams. His uncle, Robert Longmire, is a former Collingwood Football Club player. Walter Longmire (John Longmire’s great grandfather) represented New South Wales v South Australia at the MCG in 1927.

Playing career

North Melbourne
Longmire's physique and size earned him the nickname "Horse". His first match for North Melbourne was in the infamous exhibition match between North Melbourne and Carlton at The Oval in London in 1987. His first official match for North Melbourne was in the 1988 season against Footscray with a four-goal performance, but he struggled after that and near the end of the season coach John Kennedy Sr. moved him to full-back. He did well in that role during the 1989 season, holding Tony Lockett to five kicks in Round 14, but North's lack of key position players in attack saw him moved back to the forward line in August.

The 1990 season saw Longmire jump to the top of the tree: at only nineteen years of age, he kicked 98 goals and won the Coleman Medal as the league's leading goal kicker (and the youngest player to have done so). In Round 2 of that year he kicked a North Melbourne record of twelve goals against Richmond, which he broke twelve weeks later when he kicked fourteen goals in round 14 against Melbourne. Going into the final round Longmire looked likely to reach the 100-goal milestone for the season, however inaccurate kicking against a strong Collingwood defence resulted in two goals and eight behinds, leaving him two goals short. Longmire won North Melbourne's best and fairest award that year and led the club's goal kicking list every season from 1990 to 1994.

At North Melbourne, he formed a powerful goalkicking partnership with centre half forward Wayne Carey. In six seasons between 1990 and 1995, Carey and Longmire collectively kicked 768 goals (of which Longmire contributed 464) and thirteen times they combined for ten goals or more in a game. Individually, Longmire kicked 5-plus goals in a game 36 times, 7-plus goals 18 times and 10-plus twice, before a serious knee injury forced him out of the game for the 1996 season. When he returned the following year, he played out the remainder of his career in defence and in the ruck.

Longmire missed out on playing on the winning side of the 1996 premiership with a knee injury and just made it back from an elbow injury to make his last career game the 1999 Grand Final, in which the Kangaroos defeated Carlton. This was his only year to also not score a goal, managing only to kick 1 point in 10 games.

Longmire played a total of 200 games and kicked a total of 511 goals for North Melbourne from 1988 to 1999,
as well as being a member of the North Melbourne premiership side in 1999.

Coaching career

Sydney Swans
Longmire returned to New South Wales to take up an assistant coaching position with the Sydney Swans. In 2006, he was considered to be a front-runner for the St Kilda Football Club senior coaching role, which was made vacant by the sacking of Grant Thomas, however, the role later went to then-fellow Swans assistant coach Ross Lyon. In 2008, senior coach Paul Roos, appointed Longmire the Swans' "coaching co-ordinator". In a succession plan, Longmire replaced Roos as senior coach of the Sydney Swans following Roos' retirement at the end of the 2010 season.

Longmire's first game as the Sydney Swans senior coach in the 2011 season ended in a draw against , with both teams scoring 11.18 (84). His first win as senior coach came the next week, against  in Round 2, 2011.

The Swans had not won there in more than 12 years and the home team had not lost at the ground in exactly four years and one day. Also, the Swans were the only team to beat top-four side  at Patersons Stadium during the season. Those two sides won the rest of their home matches during the regular season.

Longmire took Sydney to the finals in 2011, his first year as senior coach in what was the club's 13th finals appearance in 16 seasons.

In the 2012 season in his second year as senior coach, Longmire led Sydney to third place on the AFL ladder, compiling a 16–6 record in the home-and-away season. Subsequently, his contract was extended until the end of the 2015 season.

In March 2014, Longmire signed a two-year contract extension which took his tenure to the end of the 2017 AFL season.

In the 2014 season, Longmire coached the Sydney Swans to the 2014 AFL Grand Final, but they lost to Hawthorn by a margin of 63 points with the final score being Sydney Swans 11.8 (74) to Hawthorn 21.11 (137).

In the 2016 season, Longmire coached the Sydney Swans to the 2016 AFL Grand Final, but they lost to the Western Bulldogs by a margin of 22 points with the final score being Western Bulldogs 13.11 (89) to Sydney Swans 10.7 (67).

In round 4 of the 2019 AFL season, Longmire coached his 200th game, a career milestone. Three rounds later, he overtook Paul Roos as the longest serving coach of the club. 

On 12 July 2019, Longmire extended his contract for a further three years, to remain the Sydney Swans' senior coach until at least the end of 2023. 

In 2020, Longmire coached the All-Stars team in a one-off 2020 State of Origin match which was played on 28 February 2020 at Docklands Stadium.

In the 2022 season, Longmire coached the Sydney Swans to the 2022 AFL Grand Final when they  lost to Geelong by a margin of 81 points with Geelong scoring 20.13 (133) to the Sydney Swans 8.4 (52).

Statistics

Playing statistics

|-
| 1988 ||  || 43
| 11 || 21 || 12 || 70 || 24 || 94 || 56 || 2 || 1.9 || 1.1 || 6.4 || 2.2 || 8.5 || 5.1 || 0.2 || 0
|-
| 1989 ||  || 35
| 16 || 9 || 12 || 99 || 41 || 140 || 31 || 10 || 0.6 || 0.8 || 6.2 || 2.6 || 8.8 || 1.9 || 0.6 || 0
|-
| 1990 ||  || 35
| 22 || bgcolor=CAE1FF | 98† || bgcolor="CFECEC"| 60 || 230 || 61 || 291 || 139 || 10 || 4.5 || 2.7 || 10.5 || 2.8 || 13.2 || 6.3 || 0.5 || 9
|-
| 1991 ||  || 35
| 21 || 91 || 54 || 199 || 61 || 260 || 128 || 12 || 4.3 || 2.6 || 9.5 || 2.9 || 12.4 || 6.1 || 0.6 || 8
|-
| 1992 ||  || 35
| 20 || 64 || 37 || 164 || 50 || 214 || 90 || 10 || 3.2 || 1.9 || 8.2 || 2.5 || 10.7 || 4.5 || 0.5 || 0
|-
| 1993 ||  || 35
| 20 || 75 || 29 || 151 || 59 || 210 || 81 || 9 || 3.8 || 1.5 || 7.6 || 3.0 || 10.5 || 4.1 || 0.5 || 4
|-
| 1994 ||  || 35
| 23 || 78 || 46 || 170 || 86 || 256 || 120 || 13 || 3.4 || 2.0 || 7.4 || 3.7 || 11.1 || 5.2 || 0.6 || 8
|-
| 1995 ||  || 35
| 22 || 58 || 32 || 157 || 78 || 235 || 94 || 10 || 2.6 || 1.5 || 7.1 || 3.5 || 10.7 || 4.3 || 0.5 || 0
|-
| 1996 ||  || 35
| 0 || — || — || — || — || — || — || — || — || — || — || — || — || — || — || —
|-
| 1997 ||  || 35
| 25 || 10 || 11 || 196 || 104 || 300 || 96 || 33 || 0.4 || 0.4 || 7.8 || 4.2 || 12.0 || 3.8 || 1.3 || 3
|-
| 1998 ||  || 35
| 10 || 7 || 4 || 50 || 35 || 85 || 28 || 4 || 0.7 || 0.4 || 5.0 || 3.5 || 8.5 || 2.8 || 0.4 || 1
|-
| scope=row bgcolor=F0E68C | 1999# ||  || 35
| 10 || 0 || 1 || 53 || 38 || 91 || 24 || 8 || 0.0 || 0.1 || 5.3 || 3.8 || 9.1 || 2.4 || 0.8 || 0
|- class=sortbottom
! colspan=3 | Career
! 200 !! 511 !! 298 !! 1539 !! 637 !! 2176 !! 887 !! 121 !! 2.6 !! 1.5 !! 7.7 !! 3.2 !! 10.9 !! 4.4 !! 0.6 !! 33
|}

Coaching statistics
Updated to the end of the 2022 season.

|- style="background-color: #EAEAEA"
|2011 ||  || 24
| 13 || 10 || 1 || 56.3% || 7 || 17
|-
| scope=row bgcolor=F0E68C | 2012# ||  || 25
| 19 || 6 || 0 || 76.0% || 3 || 18
|- style="background-color: #EAEAEA"
| 2013 ||  || 25
| 16 || 8 || 1 || 66.0% || 4 || 18
|-
|2014 ||  || 25
| 19 || 6 || 0 || 76.0% || 1 || 18
|- style="background-color: #EAEAEA"
|2015 ||  || 24
| 16 || 8 || 0 || 66.7% || 4 || 18
|-
|2016 ||  || 26
| 19 || 7 || 0 || 73.1% || 1 || 18
|- style="background-color: #EAEAEA"
|2017 ||  || 24
| 15 || 9 || 0 || 62.5% || 6 || 18
|-
|2018 ||  || 23
| 14 || 9 || 0 || 60.9% || 6 || 18
|- style="background-color: #EAEAEA"
|2019 ||  || 22
| 8 || 14 || 0 || 36.4% || 15 || 18
|-
|2020 ||  || 17
| 5 || 12 || 0 || 29.4% || 16 || 18
|- style="background-color: #EAEAEA"
|2021 ||  || 23
| 15 || 8 || 0 || 65.2% || 6 || 18
|-
|2022 ||  || 25
| 18 || 7 || 0 || 72.0% || 3 || 18
|- class=sortbottom
! colspan=2 | Career
! 283 !! 177 !! 104 !! 2 !! 62.9% !! colspan=2|
|}

Honours and achievements

Playing honours
Team
VFL/AFL Premiership (Kangaroos): 1999
McClelland Trophy (North Melbourne): 1998
Pre-Season Cup (North Melbourne): 1998
Individual
Coleman Medal: 1990
Syd Barker Medal (North Melbourne F.C. B&F): 1990
North Melbourne F.C. Leading Goalkicker: 1990-1994

Coaching honours
Team
AFL Premiership (Sydney): 2012
McClelland Trophy (Sydney): 2014, 2016
Individual
Jock McHale Medal: 2012
All-Australian: 2012

References

External links

John Longmire's profile at AustralianFootball.com
 Coaching statistics from AFL Tables
 Playing statistics from AFL Tables

Australian rules footballers from New South Wales
North Melbourne Football Club players
North Melbourne Football Club Premiership players
Sydney Swans coaches
Sydney Swans Premiership coaches
Syd Barker Medal winners
Coleman Medal winners
Victorian State of Origin players
New South Wales Australian rules football State of Origin players
Corowa-Rutherglen Football Club players
All-Australian coaches
1970 births
Living people
One-time VFL/AFL Premiership players
One-time VFL/AFL Premiership coaches